Ute-Henriette Ohoven (born March 10, 1946 in Tübingen, Germany) is UNESCO Special Ambassador, the Honorary President of the ZNS - Hannelore Kohl foundation and the Counsel General of the Republic of Senegal. Ute Ohoven has an estimated net worth of 20€ million.

She is married to Mario Ohoven. Michael Ohoven and Chiara Ohoven are their children.

Sources
you-stiftung.de

External links

 uteohoven.de
 

1946 births
Living people
Charity fundraisers (people)
UNESCO Goodwill Ambassadors